Cruz Lima's saddle-back tamarin (Leontocebus cruzlimai) is a species of saddle-back tamarin, a type of small monkey from South America.  Cruz Lima's saddle-back tamarin was formerly considered to be a subspecies of the brown-mantled tamarin, L. fuscicollis.  It lives in Brazil in the area near the Inauini River.  Its fur is mostly reddish orange, with a black tail and white eyebrows.  The IUCN rates it as least concern from a conservation standpoint.

References

Leontocebus
Primates of South America
Taxa named by Philip Hershkovitz
Mammals described in 1966